Roy E. Partlow (June 18, 1911 – April 19, 1987) was an American pitcher in Negro league baseball. He played between 1934 and 1951. In 1946, he was one of the first African American players signed by the Brooklyn Dodgers organization. He spent part of that season playing with Jackie Robinson at Montreal before being sent to the Trois-Rivières Royals.

References

External links
 and Seamheads
Venezuelan Professional Baseball League statistics

1911 births
1987 deaths
African-American baseball players
Granby Red Sox players
Homestead Grays players
Leopardos de Santa Clara players
Montreal Royals players
Patriotas de Venezuela players
Philadelphia Stars players
Trois-Rivières Royals players
American expatriate baseball players in Cuba
American expatriate baseball players in Canada
American expatriate baseball players in Venezuela
Azules de Veracruz players
American expatriate baseball players in Mexico
20th-century African-American sportspeople